Dramaturgy is the study of dramatic composition and the representation of the main elements of drama on the stage.

The term first appears in the eponymous work  Hamburg Dramaturgy (1767–69) by Gotthold Ephraim Lessing. Lessing composed this collection of essays on the principles of drama while working as the world's first dramaturge at the Hamburg National Theatre. Dramaturgy is distinct from play writing and directing, although the three may be practiced by one individual. Some dramatists combine writing and dramaturgy when creating a drama. Others work with a specialist, called a dramaturge, to adapt a work for the stage.

Dramaturgy may also be broadly defined as "adapting a story to actable form." Dramaturgy gives a performance work foundation and structure. Often the dramaturge's strategy is to manipulate a narrative to reflect the current Zeitgeist through cross-cultural signs, theater- and film-historical references to genre, ideology, questions of gender and racial representation, etc., in the dramatization.

Definition and history 
Dramaturgy as a practice-based as well as practice-led discipline was invented by Gotthold Ephraim Lessing, in the 18th century. The Theater of Hamburg engaged him for some years for a position today known as a "dramaturge". He was the first to occupy this role in European theater and described his task as that of a "dramatic judge" ("dramatischer Richter"), one who must assess the most compelling and appropriate means of staging a particular theatrical work. From 1767 to 1770, Lessing published a series of critical commentaries, Hamburg Dramaturgy (Hamburgische Dramaturgie). These works analyzed, criticized and theorized the current state of German theater, making Lessing the father of modern dramaturgy.

Following Lessing's Hamburgische Dramaturgie and Laokoon and Hegel's Aesthetics (1835–38), many subsequent authors, including Friedrich Hölderlin, Johann von Goethe, Friedrich Wilhelm Joseph Schelling, Thornton Wilder, Arthur Miller, and Tennessee Williams, reflected on the stage language of plays as a distinctive art form.

German playwright Gustav Freytag attempted to synthesize the components of modern dramaturgy in his 1863 book The Technique of the Drama, published in English in 1894. Known for its outline of the principles of dramatic structure, including the arc of dramatic tension and resolution referred to as Freytag's Pyramid, The Technique of the Drama is often considered the blueprint for the first Hollywood screenwriting manuals. The Technique of Play Writing (1915) by Charlton Andrews, refers to European and German traditions of dramaturgy and understanding dramatic composition.

A foundational work in the Western theatrical tradition is Poetics by Aristotle (written c. 335 BCE), which analyzes the genre of tragedy. Aristotle considers Oedipus Rex (c. 429 BCE) as the quintessential dramatic work. He analyzes the relations among character, action, and speech, gives examples of good plots, and considers the role of audience response as an aspect of theatrical form. His "rules" are referred to today as "Aristotelian drama". In Poetics, Aristotle discusses many key concepts of Greek drama, including the moment of tragic recognition (anagnorisis) and the purgation of audience feelings of pity and fear (catharsis).

Perhaps the most significant successor to Aristotelian dramaturgy is the Epic theatre developed by the twentieth century German playwright Bertolt Brecht. Many of the innovations associated with Brecht as a theorist and writer for the stage, including the concept of the "estrangement effect" (or Verfremdungseffekt) and the acting technique known as gestus, were intended as deliberate revisions of the values upheld by Aristotle.

Poetics is the earliest surviving Western work of dramatic theory. The earliest non-Western dramaturgic work is probably the Sanskrit work Natya Shastra (The Art of Theatre), written around 500 BCE to 500 CE, which describes the elements, forms, and narrative elements of the ten major types of ancient Indian drama.

Practice

Dramaturgy is a comprehensive exploration of the context in which the play resides. The dramaturge is tasked to obtain expertise on: the physical, social, political, and economic environment in which the action takes place; the psychological underpinnings of the characters; the various metaphorical expressions in the play of thematic concerns; as well as the technical consideration of the play as a piece of writing (structure, rhythm, flow, and even individual word choices).

Institutional dramaturges may participate in many phases of play production including: casting of the play; offering in-house criticism of productions-in-progress; and informing the director, the cast, and the audience about a play’s history and its current importance. In America, this type of dramaturgy is sometimes known as Production Dramaturgy. Institutional or production dramaturges may make files of materials about a play's history or social context, prepare program notes, lead post-production discussions, or write study guides for schools and groups. These actions can assist a  director in integrating textual and acting criticism, performance theory, and historical research into a production before it opens.

Copyright
Since dramaturgy is defined in a general way and the function of a dramaturge may vary from production to production, the copyright issues regarding it in the United States have very vague borders.

In 1996, there was debate on the question of the extent to which a dramaturge can claim ownership of a production, as in the case involving the estate of Jonathan Larson (the late author of the musical Rent) and Lynn Thomson, the dramaturge on the production. Thomson claimed that she was a co-author of the work and that she never assigned, licensed or otherwise transferred her rights. She asked that the court declare her a co-author of Rent and grant her 16 per cent of the author's share of the royalties. Although she made her claim only after the show became a Broadway hit, the case is not without precedent. For instance, 15 per cent of the royalties of Angels in America go to playwright Tony Kushner's dramaturge. On June 19, 1998, the United States Court of Appeals for the Second Circuit affirmed the original court's ruling that Thomson was not entitled to be credited with co-authorship of Rent and that she was not entitled to royalties. The case was ultimately settled out of court with Thomson receiving an undisclosed sum after she threatened to remove her material from the production.

See also
Dramaturge
Dramatic structure
Writing Drama, whose original title is "La Dramaturgie"

References

Further reading

Tuchmann, Kai (ed.) Postdramatic Dramaturgies - Resonances between Asia and Europe. transcript Verlag, Bielefeld 2022. ISBN 978-3-8376-5997-9

External links
A Brief History of Hollywood Dramaturgy and Modern Screenplay Structure
Dramaturgy Northwest
Literary Managers and Dramaturgs of the Americas
Dramaturgs' network, dramaturgy in the UK

Theatre
Drama